is a former Japanese football player.

Playing career
Tabuchi was born in Tokushima Prefecture on February 16, 1973. After graduating from high school, he joined his local club Otsuka Pharmaceutical in 1991. He became a regular player as right side back from first season. However his opportunity to play decreased from 1995. In 1997, he moved to Japan Football League club Consadole Sapporo. He became a regular player and the club won the champions in 1997 and was promoted to J1 League from 1998. Although he played as regular player until 2001, his opportunity to play decreased behind Naoki Sakai and Yoshihiro Nishida in 2002. In 2003, he moved to Vissel Kobe. He retired end of 2003 season.

Club statistics

References

External links

1973 births
Living people
Association football people from Tokushima Prefecture
Japanese footballers
Japan Soccer League players
J1 League players
J2 League players
Japan Football League (1992–1998) players
Tokushima Vortis players
Hokkaido Consadole Sapporo players
Vissel Kobe players
Association football defenders